James Adams (1752-1816), of Berkeley Square, Middlesex, was an English politician.

He was a Member of Parliament (MP) for West Looe 21 August 1784 - 1790, Hindon 1790 to 1796, for Bramber 1796–1802, and for Harwich 7 April 1803 - 1806 and 9 March 1807 - 1807.

His brother is Charles Adams who was also an MP.

References

1752 births
1816 deaths
People from the City of Westminster
Members of the Parliament of Great Britain for West Looe
British MPs 1784–1790
British MPs 1790–1796
British MPs 1796–1800
Members of the Parliament of the United Kingdom for English constituencies
UK MPs 1801–1802
UK MPs 1802–1806
UK MPs 1807–1812
Lords of the Admiralty